EL++ is a lightweight description logic that was designed to
capture the expressive power that is used by large-scale ontologies from practical applications
have polytime reasoning problems, in particular classification and instance checking
(www.w3.org 2010)

EL++ has been incorporated into OWL 2 as a OWL 2 EL Profile.

References

 Franz Baader, Sebastian Brandt, Carsten Lutz: Pushing the EL Envelope.  IJCAI 2005: 364-369

Non-classical logic